Rodrigo Alejandro Álvarez Zenteno (born 30 July 1966) is a Chilean politician and lawyer who served as Minister of Energy during the first government of Sebastián Piñera (2010–2014).

He was vice-president of the Constitutional Convention.

References

Living people
1966 births

People from Santiago
21st-century Chilean politicians
Ministers of Energy of Chile
Independent Democratic Union politicians
Members of the Chilean Constitutional Convention
University of Chile alumni
University of Navarra alumni
Harvard Law School alumni
Presidents of the Chamber of Deputies of Chile